Contai High School is the oldest school (established in 1857) in the sub-divisional town of Contai, Purba Medinipur, West Bengal, India. It is a boys' higher secondary school featuring both English and Bengali medium.

The school premises including the buildings, hostel, gymnasium, lab, gardens and playground lie on land provided by Rishi Bankim Chandra Chattopadhyay during his stay at Contai.  The school follows the course curricula of West Bengal Board of Secondary Education and West Bengal Council of Higher Secondary Education for standard 10th and 12th board examinations respectively.

Facilities
It has a Primary Section: (Class I - IV)
Secondary (Class V - X) and Higher Secondary (Class XI - XII) Sections have both Bengali and English Medium simultaneously. Both mediums are under WBBSE and WBCHSE board.

School Timings: Monday to Friday 10:45 A.M. to 04:30 P.M., Saturday 10:45 AM to 02:00 PM 

 Contai High School features Atal Tinkering Lab, which is a miniature form of scientific laboratories.

Classes and instructors are available for computer education and statistics (for class XI-XII).

Notable alumni
Birendranath Sasmal

External links
 Contai information

Boys' schools in India
Primary schools in West Bengal
High schools and secondary schools in West Bengal
Schools in Purba Medinipur district
Educational institutions established in 1857
1857 establishments in India